Clinton Pestano (born 11 November 1992) is a Guyanese cricketer. He made his first-class debut for Guyana in the 2016–17 Regional Four Day Competition on 23 March 2017. He made his List A debut for Guyana in the 2017–18 Regional Super50 on 2 February 2018.

He was the leading wicket-taker for Guyana in the 2018–19 Regional Super50 tournament, with fifteen dismissals in nine matches. In October 2019, he was named in Guyana's squad for the 2019–20 Regional Super50 tournament.

References

External links
 

1992 births
Living people
Guyanese cricketers
Guyana cricketers